Márcio Diogo Lobato Rodrigues (born September 22, 1985), is a Brazilian footballer who plays as an attacking midfielder for Moto Club.

Honours
Cruzeiro
 Campeonato Mineiro: 2005, 2006

Ceará
 Campeonato Cearense: 2015

External links
Diretoria anuncia primeiros reforços 

1985 births
Living people
Brazilian footballers
Campeonato Brasileiro Série A players
Campeonato Brasileiro Série B players
Campeonato Brasileiro Série C players
Campeonato Brasileiro Série D players
K League 1 players
Brazilian expatriate footballers
Brazilian expatriate sportspeople in South Korea
Expatriate footballers in South Korea
Association football midfielders
Cruzeiro Esporte Clube players
Ipatinga Futebol Clube players
Democrata Futebol Clube players
Villa Nova Atlético Clube players
Paraná Clube players
Suwon Samsung Bluewings players
Associação Atlética Ponte Preta players
Esporte Clube XV de Novembro (Piracicaba) players
Avaí FC players
São Bernardo Futebol Clube players
Sampaio Corrêa Futebol Clube players
Fortaleza Esporte Clube players
Boa Esporte Clube players
Esporte Clube Democrata players
Brasiliense Futebol Clube players
União Recreativa dos Trabalhadores players
Sportspeople from Maranhão